1st Moroccan Infantry Division may refer to:

1st Moroccan Division (1939)
Moroccan Division (France)

Military units and formations disambiguation pages